The list of ambassadors of France to South Korea began after diplomatic relations were established in 1886. The official title of this French diplomat is "Ambassador extraordinary and plenipotentiary of the French Republic to the Republic of Korea" (ambassadrice extraordinaire et plénipotentiaire de la République française auprès de la République de Corée).

Franco-Korean diplomatic relations were initially established during the French Third Republic of French history and during the Joseon period of Korean history.

List of heads of mission

Ambassadors of the Third Republic 
  Victor Collin de Plancy, appointed in 1888 
  H. Fradin, in 1892
  Victor Collin de Plancy, 1901.

Ambassadors to South Korea (post Korean division) 
The updated list is available on the website of the French Embassy in Seoul.

See also
 France-Korea Treaty of 1886
 List of diplomatic missions in South Korea

Notes

References
 Halleck, Henry Wager. (1861). International law: or, Rules regulating the intercourse of states in peace and war 	New York: D. Van Nostrand. OCLC 852699
 Kim, Chun-gil. (2005). The History of Korea. Westport, Connecticut: Greenwood Press. ; ;  OCLC 217866287
 Korean Mission to the Conference on the Limitation of Armament, Washington, D.C., 1921–1922. (1922). Korea's Appeal to the Conference on Limitation of Armament. Washington: U.S. Government Printing Office. OCLC 12923609

South Korea
France